The Sniffer (Russian and ) is a Russian-language detective series produced and shot in Ukraine by FILM.UA Television, created, co-written, and directed by Artyom Litvinenko.

Premise
The show is about a man, known as The Sniffer, who has an unusually sensitive sense of smell that allows him to investigate crimes by detecting and distinguishing trace amounts of various substances. He works alongside his childhood friend, Viktor Lebedev, an officer in the Special Bureau of Investigations.

Cast and characters
 Kirill Käro as The Sniffer
 Ivan Oganesyan as Col. Viktor Lebedev
 Mariya Anikanova as Yulia
 Nina Gogaeva as Tatyana Voskresenskaya
 Nikolai Chindyajkin as General
 Aleksey Zorin as Maxim
 Agnė Grudytė as Irina Nordin
 Viktor Shchur as SBR employee
 Denis Martynov as Gena

Production
The series premiered on 11 November 2013 on the Ukrainian TV channel ICTV and began airing in Russia on 16 December 2013, for 1TV. By 2014, the series had been sold in sixty countries.

Even before its premiere, the series was officially renewed for a second season, with eight new episodes. The second season opened on 1TV on 5 October 2015, with cinematography by Graham Frake, who had previously been head of photography for Downton Abbey.

In 2016, Amazon added the first season to their Amazon Prime lineup.

By 31 January 2017, filming of the third season was completed. Like the first two seasons, the third season consists of eight episodes, which were shot over the course of six months.

Beginning in May 2017, the first two seasons were streamed on Netflix and the third season was later added. As of 2021, Netflix no longer carries the series.

References

External links
 
 The Sniffer — official page at FILM.UA site

2010s Ukrainian television series
2013 Ukrainian television series debuts
Police procedural television series
Detective television series
Ukrainian television series
Channel One Russia original programming
Russian-language television shows
2010s science fiction television series
Fictional portrayals of police departments in Ukraine